Martijn de Zwart (born 8 November 1990) is a Dutch footballer who plays as a goalkeeper for Dutch Tweede Divisie club Quick Boys, where he is also the current goalkeeping coach.

Career
A prospect of Quick Boys, De Zwart moved to ADO Den Haag in July 2011. At ADO, he was mostly a backup for Gino Coutinho and Robert Zwinkels, but he managed to make his professional debut on 9 March 2013 in a 1–1 draw in the Eredivisie match against AZ. In June 2013, he signed a one-year contract extension with the club.

After the expiration of his contract on 30 June 2014, De Zwart returned to childhood club Quick Boys.

After six years at Quick Boys, where he mainly played as a backup in the later years, De Zwart became goalkeepers coach in July 2020, while continuing as a backup to starter Paul van der Helm.

Honours
Quick Boys
 Hoofdklasse: 2015–16

Individual
 Quick Boys Player of the Season: 2009–10

References

External links
 Voetbal International profile 

1990 births
Living people
Dutch footballers
Association football goalkeepers
Eredivisie players
ADO Den Haag players
Quick Boys players
Footballers from Katwijk
Tweede Divisie players
Vierde Divisie players